Paraverrucosa is a genus of orb-weaver spiders first described by Cândido Firmino de Mello-Leitão in 1939 to contain the type species, Paraverrucosa neglecta. Each of the four species have been moved around between Wagneriana, Edricus, and Verrucosa, but were all moved to this genus in 2020.

Species
 it contains four species:
P. eupalaestra (Mello-Leitão, 1943) – Brazil, Argentina
P. heteracantha (Mello-Leitão, 1943) – Brazil, Argentina
P. neglecta Mello-Leitão, 1939 – Trinidad to Argentina
P. uzaga (Levi, 1991) – Brazil, Paraguay, Argentina

Formerly included:
P. octospinosa Mello-Leitão, 1949 (Transferred to Wagneriana)
P. uropygialis Mello-Leitão, 1944 (Transferred to Alpaida)

See also
 List of Araneidae species: N–Z

References

Further reading

Araneidae genera
Taxa named by Cândido Firmino de Mello-Leitão